Princess Patricia, was launched on 5 October 1948 and completed in May 1949 for the Canadian Pacific Railway, was the first ship to operate for Princess Cruises, one of the largest cruise lines in the world. Stanley McDonald chartered the Canadian Pacific steamer in 1965. He intended to establish the winter cruising market by operating out of Los Angeles and cruising to Acapulco, Mexico. This is the period when Princess Patricia, which cruised to Alaska, would be laid up. 

The second of Canadian Pacific Line's two 356 foot long, 56 foot wide, 5,611/6,062 ton (1963 refit) Fairfield Shipbuilding, Scotland-built west Pacific coast steam turbine passenger ships, Princess Patricia was named in 1949 for Princess Patricia of Connaught. She was retired from Alaskan cruising services in 1978, used as a floating hotel in Vancouver, British Columbia for the 1986 World's Fair.

The SS Princess Patricia was used for filming locations for the 1989 film,  Friday the 13th: Jason Takes Manhattan, which was the eighth film in the Friday the 13th film franchise.

The ship arrived at Kaohsiung for breaking on 8 June 1989.

References

1948 ships
Ships of Princess Cruises